Ross Lake Provincial Park is a provincial park in British Columbia, Canada. The park is located within the asserted traditional territory of the Gitxsan people, south of Nine Mile Mountain, just east of Hazelton in the Skeena Country.

Images

References

Skeena Country
Provincial parks of British Columbia
1974 establishments in British Columbia
Protected areas established in 1974